Clarence C. Mitchell (March 4, 1897 – June 25, 1986) was an American lawyer and politician.

Mitchell was born on a farm in Arimet, Lyon County, Minnesota and graduated from Tracy High School in Tracy, Minnesota. He received his law degree from University of Minnesota Law School in 1923 and was admitted to the Minnesota bar. He lived in Princeton, Minnesota with his wife and family. Mitchell served as the Mille Lacs County Attorney on the Princeton School Board from 1942 to 1946. He served in the Minnesota Senate from 1947 to 1966. Michell died at the Hillcrest Retirement Center in Minnetonka, Minnesota.

References

1897 births
1986 deaths
People from Lyon County, Minnesota
People from Princeton, Minnesota
University of Minnesota Law School alumni
Minnesota lawyers
School board members in Minnesota
Minnesota state senators